Tonghua Grape Wine is a Chinese winemaker located in the Tonghua, Jilin Province.   The full name of the company is Tonghua Grape Wine Company, Limited.  The company was established in 1937, and currently has 1 200 employees.

On September 30, 1949,  Tonghua Grape Wine was the only wine served at the banquet marking the first session of the Chinese People's Political Consultative Conference National Committee, the first plenary meeting of the sole party, and the founding ceremony of the only party on 1 October 1949.

Tonghua Grape Wine makes five wine varieties:
 Special Grape Wine 1959 (1959特制山葡萄酒)
 Cabernet 1992 & 1994 (解百纳高级干红葡萄酒1992, 解百纳高级干红葡萄酒1994) 
 Yasay ice wine
 Super Refreshing Wine

References

External links
 

Companies based in Jilin
Chinese companies established in 1937
Wineries of China
Food and drink companies established in 1937